Mylothris kiwuensis is a butterfly in the family Pieridae. It is found in the Democratic Republic of the Congo, Uganda, Rwanda, Tanzania and possibly Kenya. The habitat consists of primary forests.

The larvae feed on Santalales species.

Subspecies
M. k. kiwuensis (Rwanda, Democratic Republic of the Congo: Kivu)
M. k. rhodopoides Talbot, 1944 (eastern Democratic Republic of the Congo, Rwanda, Uganda, north-western Tanzania, possibly Kenya)
M. k. katera Berger, 1979 (western and southern Uganda)
M. k. marielouisae Berger, 1979 (Democratic Republic of the Congo)

References

Taxa named by Karl Grünberg
Butterflies described in 1910
Pierini